Mount Washington is a historic neighborhood in the San Rafael Hills of Northeast Los Angeles, California. Founded in 1909, it includes the Southwest Museum, the world headquarters of the Self-Realization Fellowship, and Eldred Street, one of the three steepest streets in Los Angeles.

History
In the 19th century the area was part of Rancho San Rafael.

Mount Washington was founded in 1909 as a subdivision laid out by real estate developer Robert Marsh. Marsh built the Mount Washington Hotel at the summit of Mount Washington, and the Los Angeles and Mount Washington Railway Company was soon established as a funicular railway up the hill as an alternative to constructing roads up the area's steep hillsides. The railway operated until January 1919.

By the late 2000s, the neighborhood attracted middle- and upper-income residents, mostly whites, Latinos, and Asians.

The district is generally considered the most affluent area of the East Side, and also contains the region's largest concentration of non-Latino whites (though not as affluent as the neighboring cities of South Pasadena, San Marino, and southwest Pasadena; for instance, 30% of census tract 1851 (Mount Washington) has incomes of $100,000 or greater; while 35% of census tract 4806 (South Pasadena) has incomes of $100,000 or greater). The "beauty and the quirky nature of Mount Washington" has inspired songs.

In recent years, many homebuyers have become attracted to the area as a relatively affordable alternative to the Westside.

Population

The 2000 U.S. census counted 12,728 residents in the 1.85-square-mile Mount Washington neighborhood—or 6,878 people per square mile, an average population density for the city. In 2008, the city estimated that the resident population had increased to 13,531.

In 2008 the median age for residents was 33, about average for the city and the county. The percentage of never-married men (40.9%) was among the county's highest.

According to the Mapping L.A. project of the Los Angeles Times, based on the 2000 census, the neighborhood was "moderately diverse" ethnically, with a high percentage of Latino residents. The breakdown was Latinos, 61.2%; whites, 20.8%;  Asians, 12.8% ; blacks, 2.6%; and others, 2.7%.  Mexico (44.4%) and El Salvador (9.6%) were the most common places of birth for the 41.5% of the residents who were born abroad—an average figure for Los Angeles.

Over the last decade, the demographics have been shifting.  As of 2009, Mount Washington has no racial or ethnic group in a majority.  According to the American Community Survey (2009), Mount Washington is 33% White, 3% Black, 47% Latino, 9% Asian, and 7% other (census tract 1851). The only census tract entirely within Mount Washington's boundaries is census tract 1851 (census tracts 1852 and 1862 are also in Mount Washington but also include surrounding neighborhoods).  Census tract 1851 is on the east side of Mount Washington, and includes Moon Canyon Park and the Carlin G. Smith Recreation area; and it is extremely racially and ethnically diverse, even for Los Angeles.

The 2000 census found that the median yearly household income in 2008 dollars was $57,725, about average for the city. The average household size of 2.9 people was about the same as Los Angeles as a whole. Renters occupied 45.1% of the housing stock and house- or apartment-owners held 54.9%.

Mount Washington (tract 1851) has a median household income of about $60,000; and 30% of its residents have a household income greater than $100,000 per year; neighboring census tracts shared with Mount Washington and other neighborhoods also have somewhat similar income data.

Geography

According to the Mapping L.A. project, Mount Washington is bordered on the north by Eagle Rock, on the east by Highland Park, on the south, southwest and west by Cypress Park and on the northwest by Glassell Park.

Mount Washington is split between Los Angeles City Council districts 1 and 14 and is part of California's 34th congressional district. The neighborhood lies mostly within ZIP code 90065, with an eastern portion in 90042, and the area code is 323.

Education

Twenty-five percent of Mount Washington residents aged 25 and older had earned a four-year degree by 2000, an average figure for both the city and the county. One school lies within the neighborhood — Mount Washington Elementary School, LAUSD, at 3981 San Rafael Avenue. Mount Washington students "consistently score among the top schools in Los Angeles on the Academic Performance Index."

Notable places
Southwest Museum
Lummis House
World Headquarters of the Self-Realization Fellowship
Eldred Street, between Avenue 50 and Cross Avenue on the northeast side of Mount Washington, with a slope of 33% grade, is one of the three steepest streets in Los Angeles and one of the steepest streets in the world (Baldwin Street, Dunedin, New Zealand is 35% and Bradford Street in San Francisco is 41%). Bottom of the steep climb is

Notable residents
Mahershala Ali, actor
James Simpson Conwell, City Council member, businessman and inventor
Matthew Murphy, singer and musician (The Wombats)
Jack Smith, columnist
Jesse Thorn, public radio host and founder of the Maximum Fun podcast network
Antonio Villaraigosa, mayor of Los Angeles and speaker of the State Assembly
Nancy Cartwright, actor and voice actor of Bart Simpson of the multi Emmy Award winning television show "The Simpsons" (1987- )
 Marilyn Ferguson, bestselling New Age author and publisher

See also
 Los Angeles Historic-Cultural Monuments on the East and Northeast Sides

References

External links

 Mount Washington page at the Mapping L.A. project
 History of the Mount Washington hotel and funicular
 Arroyo Seco Neighborhood Council, serving Mount Washington
 History of Mount Washington

 
1909 establishments in California
Neighborhoods in Los Angeles
Northeast Los Angeles
Populated places established in 1909
San Rafael Hills